Ki no Tomonori (紀 友則) (c. 850 – c. 904) was an early Heian waka poet of the court, a member of the sanjūrokkasen or Thirty-six Poetry Immortals. He was a compiler of the Kokin Wakashū, though he certainly did not see it to completion as the anthology includes a eulogy to him composed by Ki no Tsurayuki, his cousin and colleague in the compilation effort. Ki no Tomonori is the author of several poems in the Kokin Wakashū, and a few of his poems appear in later official collections. A collection of his poems from various sources appeared as the tomonori shū.

Tomonori's most famous waka is "Hisakata no", included in Hyakunin Isshu that was compiled in the 13th century:
Hisakata no (From afar literally, but a pillow word for light)
Hikari nodokeki (Of peaceful light)
Haru no hi ni (On the day of spring)
Shizugokoro naku (Without quiet minds)
Hana no chiruran (Do the cherry flowers fall?)
This waka has been made a choral song "Hisakata No (In the Peaceful Light)" by Ruth Morris Gray and is sung by various choral groups of the world.

References

Japanese poets
Hyakunin Isshu poets
Ki clan
850s births
900s deaths
Year of birth uncertain
Year of death uncertain